The Grand Archives is the debut full-length album by Seattle, United States, band Grand Archives.

Track listing 

 "Torn Blue Foam Couch" – 3:27
 "Miniature Birds" – 3:33
 "Swan Matches" – 4:17
 "Index Moon" – 2:57 
 "George Kaminski" – 4:23
 "A Setting Sun" – 3:43
 "Breezy No Breezy" – 1:59
 "Sleepdriving" – 5:20
 "Louis Riel" – 2:29
 "The Crime Window" – 3:44
 "Orange Juice" – 1:32

Grand Archives albums
2008 debut albums